The Bahay Tsinoy is a building in Intramuros, Manila, Philippines which houses the Kaisa-Angelo King Heritage Center, a museum documents the history, lives and contributions of the ethnic Chinese in the Philippine life and history.

Overview
The museum was designed by Eva Penamora in collaboration with the late architect Honrado Fernandez in 1996, and completed and inaugurated in 1999. Kaisa Para sa Kaunlaran, Inc., a non-profit organization co-founded by Teresita Ang-See, envisioned the project to provide another venue for advocating patriotism to the Philippines and promoting cultural identity and understanding between the local Chinese and Filipino communities, after the acclaimed bi-lingual children's educational television program Pinpin in the early 1990s.

Funding for the land and building structure was advanced by Angelo King Foundation and eventually raised through generous contributions from different levels of Filipino-Chinese community, from tai-pans to average wage-earners.

The museum is divided into the following sections:

 Early contacts
 The Parian
 Colonial culture
 Emergence of the Chinese community
 In defense of freedom
 Life in the 1800s
 National leaders of Chinese descent
 Gallery of rare prints and photographs
 Martyr's hall
 Ceramics collection
 Rare Philippine shell collection
 Tsinoys in nation-building (inaugurated in 2004)

The museum is fully air-conditioned and housed within the Kaisa-Angelo King Heritage Center building, which also houses the office of Kaisa Para sa Kaunlaran, Inc., Chinbin See Memorial Library, the Await Keng Theater Auditorium, the Benito Cu Uy Gam Hall, and the Pao Shi Tien and Madame Limpe seminar rooms, which all constitute the Kaisa Heritage Center.

See also
Chinese Filipino
Sangley
List of museums in the Philippines

References

Literature

External links

Bahay Tsinoy website
KAISA Heritage Center website

1996 establishments in the Philippines
Museums established in 1996

Museums in Manila
Ethnic museums
Art museums and galleries in the Philippines
Museums of Chinese culture abroad
Neoclassical architecture in the Philippines
Buildings and structures in Intramuros